The spot-breasted oriole (Icterus pectoralis) is a species of bird in the family Icteridae.

It is a mid-sized songbird and generally typical oriole. It is bright orange overall with a black bib and black spotting on the sides of the breast. The sexes are similar looking generally but females and juveniles are olive-green on the back and tail, dusky wings, and little or no black on face, throat, or breast. Adults measure  in length. The wing bone measures , the tail measures , the culmen measures  and the tarsus measures .

It is native to Costa Rica, El Salvador, Guatemala, Honduras, Mexico, and Nicaragua.

Its natural habitats are subtropical or tropical dry forests, subtropical or tropical moist lowland forests, and heavily degraded former forest.

The spot-breasted oriole ranges only on the Pacific side of Central America. An introduced breeding population also exists on the Atlantic coast of southern Florida. The population is considered to be established enough to be "countable" for birdwatchers by the ABA.

References

Further reading

External links
Stamps for El Salvador and Nicaragua
Spot-breasted oriole photo gallery - VIREO

spot-breasted oriole
spot-breasted oriole
Birds of Central America
Birds of Mexico
Birds of Guatemala
Birds of El Salvador
Birds of Honduras
Birds of Nicaragua
Birds of Costa Rica
spot-breasted oriole
Taxonomy articles created by Polbot